is a Japanese professional wrestler, better known by his ring name  and is currently working for the Japanese professional wrestling promotion DDT Pro-Wrestling (DDT).

Professional wrestling career

Dramatic Dream Team/DDT Pro Wrestling (2002–present)
Sakai made his professional wrestling debut for Dramatic Dream Team (DDT) under his real name, Yoshihiro Sakai at a Non-Fix event on June 20, 2002 in a losing effort to Hero!.

Sakai was a part of Team Midbreath alongside Sanshiro Takagi (under the name Mr. Strawberry) and Ken Ohka who went under the nickname of O.K. Revolution, and together they were the inaugural Sea Of Japan 6-Person Tag Team Champions after defeating Super Uchuu Power, Tomohiko Hashimoto and Shuji Ishikawa in a tournament final which took place at the I Shall Return event on July 20, 2003.

In 2012, he assumed a masked character by the name of Super Sasadango Machine (a parody of New Japan Pro Wrestling's Super Strong Machine).

During his tenure with DDT, he worked alongside various wrestlers and personalities such as Ken Ohka, Ladybeard, LiLiCo and Makoto Oishi with whom he won the KO-D 10-Man Tag Team Championship at Ryōgoku Peter Pan 2017 on August 20. During their reign, Keisuke Ishii replaced Ladybeard in several title defenses such as the one that occurred at God Bless DDT on November 23, 2017 where thet fought Shiro Koshinaka, Sanshiro Takagi, Toru Owashi, Shigehiro Irie and Antonio Honda in a ten-man tag team match to retain the titles. On September 27, 2015, at Who's Gonna Top?, Sasadango teamed up with fellow #OhkaEmpire stable members Ken Ohka and Danshoku Dino to defeat Team Dream Futures (Keisuke Ishii, Shigehiro Irie and Soma Takao) for the KO-D 6-Man Tag Team Championship. At Ultimate Party 2019, Sakai teamed up with Jiro Kuroshio, Makoto Oishi, Hiroshi Yamato and Yuna Manase to battle Danshoku Dino, Asuka, Yuki Iino, Mizuki and Trans-Am★Hiroshi in a losing effort for the vacant KO-D 10-Man Tag Team Championship.

Championships and accomplishments
Dramatic Dream Team/DDT Pro-Wrestling
DDT Extreme Championship (2 times)
Ironman Heavymetalweight Championship (10 times)
Jiyūgaoka 6-Person Tag Team Championship (1 time) – with Harashima and Yusuke Inokuma
KO-D 6-Man Tag Team Championship (2 times) – with Ken Ohka, Danshoku Dino and Kenso
KO-D 10-Man/8-Man Championship (2 times) – with Makoto Oishi, LiLiCo, Ken Ohka and Ladybeard (1) and Antonio Honda, Kazuki Hirata and Shinya Aoki (1)
Sea of Japan 6-Person Tag Team Championship (1 time) – with Mr. Strawberry and O.K. Revolution
Union Pro-Wrestling
World Aipoke Championship (1 time)

References 

1977 births
Living people
Japanese male professional wrestlers
20th-century professional wrestlers
21st-century professional wrestlers
DDT Extreme Champions
Ironman Heavymetalweight Champions
Jiyūgaoka 6-Person Tag Team Champions
KO-D 6-Man Tag Team Champions
KO-D 8-Man/10-Man Tag Team Champions
Sea of Japan 6-Person Tag Team Champions
World Aipoke Champions